Microtalis is a genus of moths of the family Crambidae. It contains only one species, Microtalis epimetalla, which is found in Australia, where it has been recorded from Northern Territories.

References

Natural History Museum Lepidoptera genus database

Crambinae
Crambidae genera
Taxa named by Alfred Jefferis Turner